"To Lucasta, Going to the Warres" is a 1649 poem by Richard Lovelace. It was published in the collection Lucasta by Lovelace of that year. The initial poems were addressed to Lucasta, not clearly identified with any real-life woman, under the titles "Going beyond the Seas" and "Going to the Warres", on a chivalrous note.

Text

See also
 To Althea, from Prison
 1640 in poetry, the year Lucasta was written
 1649 in poetry, the year the poem was published

Notes

External links

 

English poems